Green Bay Road Historic District may refer to:

Green Bay Road Historic District (Lake Forest, Illinois), listed on the National Register of Historic Places in Lake County, Illinois
Vine-Oakwood-Green Bay Road Historic District, Lake Forest, Illinois, listed on the National Register of Historic Places in Lake County, Illinois
Green Bay Road Historic District (Thiensville, Wisconsin), listed on the National Register of Historic Places in Ozaukee County, Wisconsin